Mohammed Ajnane (born 9 May 1990 in Alkmaar) is a Dutch professional footballer who plays as an attacking midfielder.

Club career
He formerly played for FC Volendam, FC Eindhoven and FC Chabab. In summer 2015 he moved to Telstar, making his debut in August 2015 against RKC Waalwijk.

References

External links
 Voetbal International profile 
 

1990 births
Living people
Sportspeople from Alkmaar
Dutch sportspeople of Moroccan descent
Association football midfielders
Dutch footballers
FC Volendam players
FC Eindhoven players
SC Telstar players
Eerste Divisie players
Derde Divisie players
AFC '34 players
Footballers from North Holland